is the debut single by Japanese rock band Carnation. Written by band founder Masataro Naoe, the single was released independently in November 1984. The band re-recorded the song for the CD release of their 1988 album Gong Show. They once again re-recorded the song in 2004 as the B-side of their 20th anniversary single "Angel".

Track listing 
All lyrics are written by Masataro Naoe; all music is composed by and arranged by Masataro Naoe.

Chisato Moritaka version 

"Yoru no Entotsu" was covered by Japanese singer/songwriter Chisato Moritaka in her 1989 album Hijitsuryokuha Sengen, based on Carnation's 1988 re-recording. Though it was never released as a single, the song has been a regular staple in Moritaka's live set list. The music video features Moritaka performing the song with Carnation.

For the 2013 Carnation tribute album Nande Kimi wa Boku yori Boku no Koto Kuwashii no?, Moritaka and Carnation re-recorded the song; this time, with Moritaka supplying the drum tracks. This version is also available in her 2015 self-covers DVD Love Vol. 8. She uploaded the promo video on her YouTube channel on September 7, 2014.

Other cover versions 
 Nantyara Idol covered the song in 2020. The single also includes Carnation's 1988 version of the song as the B-side.

References

External links 
 

1984 debut singles
1984 songs
Japanese-language songs
Chisato Moritaka songs